Chenopodiastrum hybridum is a species of flowering plant in the family Amaranthaceae.
It is found in Europe and Asia.

References 

Chenopodioideae
Flora of Malta